Brian To'o (born 18 August 1998) is a Samoa international rugby league footballer who plays as a er for the Penrith Panthers in the NRL.

He won both the 2021 and the 2022 NRL Grand Finals with the Panthers. He has represented the NSW Blues in State of Origin and Samoa at Test and 9's level.

Background
To'o was born in Sydney. His parents are of Samoan and distant Chinese descent.

To’o grew up in the Sydney suburb of Mount Druitt and was educated at Rooty Hill High School. He played his junior rugby league for St Marys Saints.

Career

2019
To'o made his NRL debut in round 10 of the 2019 NRL season for Penrith against the New Zealand Warriors.

To'o scored his first try in the top grade in Round 14 of the 2019 NRL season against South Sydney at ANZ Stadium in a 19–18 victory.
In Round 18 against St George, To'o scored two tries as Penrith won the match 40–18 at Panthers Stadium.

To'o made a total of 15 appearances for Penrith in the 2019 NRL season as the club finished tenth on the table and missed out on the finals for the first time since 2015.

2020
In round 8 of the 2020 NRL season, To'o was taken from the field during Penrith's 19–12 victory over Wests Tigers at Bankwest Stadium.  It was later revealed To'o would be ruled out for two months with a grade-three syndesmosis injury.

He played a total of 16 games for Penrith in the 2020 NRL season as the club claimed the Minor Premiership and reached the 2020 NRL Grand Final.  To'o played in the grand final and scored a second half try in Penrith's 26–20 loss against Melbourne.

2021
In round 4 of the 2021 NRL season, he scored two tries in a 46–6 victory over Manly-Warringah at Brookvale Oval.

On 30 May, he was selected by New South Wales for game one of the 2021 State of Origin series. At the time of his selection, To’o lead the league in both run metres and post-contact metres for players in any position. He scored two tries in the opening game of the series as New South Wales defeated Queensland 50–6.

In round 15, To'o scored two tries for Penrith in a 38–12 victory over the Sydney Roosters.

On 27 July, To'o was ruled out for at least six weeks after suffering a syndesmosis injury in Penrith's victory over Brisbane.

In round 25, To'o scored a hat-trick in Penrith's 40–6 victory over Parramatta.
On 27 September, To'o was named Dally M Winger of the year alongside Manly's Reuben Garrick.

To'o played a total of 21 games for Penrith in the 2021 NRL season including the club's 2021 NRL Grand Final victory over South Sydney.

2022
In round 2 of the 2022 NRL season, To'o was taken from the field during Penrith's victory over St. George Illawarra. It was later announced that To'o would miss six to eight matches with a knee injury.

To'o made his return to the Penrith side in round 9 against Parramatta which ended in a 22–20 defeat.

On 29 May, To'o was selected by New South Wales to play in game one of the 2022 State of Origin series.

In round 24, To'o scored two tries for Penrith in a 46-12 victory over the New Zealand Warriors.

In the 2022 Qualifying Final, To'o scored two tries in Penrith's 27-8 victory over Parramatta.

To'o played in Penrith's 2022 NRL Grand Final victory over Parramatta scoring two tries as Penrith finished 28-12 winners.

In October he was named in the Samoa squad for the 2021 Rugby League World Cup.

To'o played in every game for Samoa at the 2021 Rugby League World Cup including the final against Australia. To'o scored a second half try as Samoa lost 30-10.

In November he was named in the 2021 RLWC Team of the Tournament.

Honours
Individual
 Dally M Winger of The Year: 2021

Club
 2020 Minor Premiership Winners
 2020 NRL Grand Final Runner-up
 2021 NRL Grand Final Winners
 2022 Minor Premiership Winners
 2022 NRL Grand Final Winners

Representative
 2021 State of Origin series Winners

Personal life
To’o proposed to Moesha Crichton-Ropati at Suncorp Stadium amid the immediate post-match celebrations by the Penrith team of their grand final victory on 3 October 2021.

References

External links

Penrith Panthers profile
Samoa profile

1998 births
Living people
Australian rugby league players
Australian people of Chinese descent
Australian sportspeople of Samoan descent
Samoa national rugby league team players
Penrith Panthers players
New South Wales Rugby League State of Origin players
Rugby league wingers
Rugby league players from Sydney